Stirlingia seselifolia is a herb or shrub endemic to Western Australia.

It blooms between September and October producing yellow-cream-brown flowers.

It is found on low-lying areas in the South West and Great Southern regions of Western Australia where it grows in sandy soils over laterite.

References

Eudicots of Western Australia
seselifolia
Endemic flora of Western Australia
Plants described in 1923